The following are the national records in athletics in the Philippines maintained by country's national athletics federation: Philippine Amateur Track and Field Association (PATAFA).

Outdoor
Key to tables:

w = windy conditions

NWI = no wind measurement

A = affected by altitude

Men

Women

Mixed

Indoor

Men

Women

Notes

References
General
Filipino Outdoor Records 27 August 2021 updated
Specific

External links
PATAFA web site
Pinoyathletics
Filipino Absolute Records (Pinoyathletics)

Philippines
Athletics
Records
Athletics